The Thicket may refer to

 The Thicket (novel), 2013
 The Thicket (album), 1998
 The Thicket, Newfoundland and Labrador, Canadian settlement

See also 
 Thicket (disambiguation)
 The Thickety